Calmels-et-le-Viala is a commune in the Aveyron department in southern France.

Geography
The commune is traversed by the Dourdou de Camarès River.

Population

See also
Communes of the Aveyron department

References

Communes of Aveyron
Aveyron communes articles needing translation from French Wikipedia